Krachia is a genus of minute sea snails, marine gastropod molluscs in the family Cerithiopsidae.

Species
Species in the genus Krachia include:
 Krachia cossmanni (Dautzenberg & Fischer H., 1896)
 Krachia cylindrata (Jeffreys, 1885)
 Krachia guernei (Dautzenberg & Fischer H., 1896)
 † Krachia korytnicensis (Baluk, 1975)
 Krachia obeliscoides (Jeffreys, 1885)
 Krachia tiara (Monterosato, 1874)

References

 Gofas, S.; Le Renard, J.; Bouchet, P. (2001). Mollusca. in: Costello, M.J. et al. (Ed.) (2001). European register of marine species: a check-list of the marine species in Europe and a bibliography of guides to their identification. Collection Patrimoines Naturels. 50: pp. 180–213

Cerithiopsidae